Stony Plain Road is an expressway and arterial road Edmonton, Alberta.  Parkland Highway is an alternative route to the corresponding section of Highway 16 in Parkland County.

Overview

Stony Plain Road
Stony Plain Road is an Expressway until it reaches Anthony Henday Drive .  Soon after entering the city limits, the westbound and eastbound traffic lanes separate into two separate one-way streets.  Stony Plain Road at this time refers only to the westbound street (101 Avenue), while eastbound traffic becomes 100 Avenue.  Both sections cross Edmonton's ring road, Anthony Henday Drive. After Anthony Henday Northbound, there are a few eastbound lanes, to better serve Place LaRue, a commercial area with big-box stores, hotels, restaurants, and other commercial activity catering to travellers and commuters.  This is especially true near the intersection with 170 Street; however, Stony Plain Road is primarily a westbound road, and the eastbound lanes end at 175 Street.  After 170 Street the road again carries both directions of traffic, but 100 Avenue remains a one-way street until 163 Street.  East of 170 Street the road passes by the Mayfield Common strip mall, and through some mixed residential-commercial areas (Glenwood) and a low-income neighbourhood (Britannia Youngstown).  East of 142 Street, Stony Plain Road branches northwest while the main roadway continues as 102 Avenue towards downtown.

103A / 104 Avenue
Stony Plain Road continues as a spur of 102 Avenue into the upscale residential neighbourhoods of Glenora and, after passing over Groat Road, Westmount.  After crossing 121 Street, the road's name changes to 104 Avenue which passes in front of the old Molson's brewery.

Prior to 1989, 104 Avenue formed the south boundary of the Old Canadian National rail yard.  After the railway yard's closure, 104 Avenue became a major site of redevelopment. Here the road passes a block south of the boundary between Oliver and Downtown and the neighbourhoods of Queen Mary Park and Central McDougall, the so-called "North Edge" of downtown. In the area to either side of 116 Street, 104 Avenue is lined to north by the Oliver Square West and East strip malls and condo developments, and to the south by the Longstreet Mall and several other smaller strip malls.  From 112 Street to 104 Street, 104 Avenue runs along the south side of MacEwan University City Centre Campus. Continuing east, 104 Avenue passes the 104 Street Promenade in Edmonton's warehouse district, and Rogers Place.

At 101 Street, the road again changes names to 103A Avenue, it then passes on the south side of the CN Tower, the north side of Edmonton City Hall, the south side of Edmonton Police Headquarters, and the north side of Chinatown. Eventually it merges into Jasper Avenue.

102 Avenue
102 Avenue is a short arterial road west of downtown Edmonton.  102 Avenue is first occupied by Stony Plain Road at 149 Street.  It then changes name to 102 Avenue at 142 Street. Prior to flying over Groat Road, it passes by Government House and the former site of the Royal Alberta Museum.  It then sees the official start of Jasper Avenue at 125 Street.  At 124 Street it transitions from an arterial to a collector road, with inbound traffic following 124 Street south for one block before it turns east and becomes Jasper Avenue. 102 Avenue enters the neighbourhood of Oliver and ends at 111 Street. A separate segment of 102 Avenue begins west of 109 Street and passes through downtown Edmonton, ending at a five-way intersection at Jasper Avenue and 95 Street.

Neighbourhoods
List of neighbourhoods Stony Plain Road runs through, in order from west to east:
Secord
Stewart Greens
La Perle
Place LaRue
Terra Losa
Britannia Youngstown
Glenwood
West Jasper Place
Canora
Grovenor
Westmount
Glenora
Oliver
Downtown
Boyle Street

Major intersections
This is a list of major intersections, starting at the west end of Highway 16A.

Stony Plain Road (101 Avenue) & 102 Avenue

Stony Plain Road & 104/103A Avenue

See also 

 List of avenues in Edmonton
 Transportation in Edmonton

References

Roads in Edmonton
Former segments of the Trans-Canada Highway